Napier Bridge is a bridge in Chennai, India, built over the Coovum River, connecting Fort St. George with the Marina beach. It is also one of the historic structures and landmark of the city.

History 
One of the city's oldest bridges, it was built in 1869 by Francis Napier who was the Governor of Madras from 1866 to 1872.

Structure 
Alongside the iron bridge built in 1869, a new bridge was built in 1999 with a -wide carriageway on the western side.

Beautification 

As part of the Marina Beach beautification project, special lights have been fixed beneath the bridge providing a visual effect as if the bridge is floating on the river water. A combination of lighting effects has been created on the arches and surface using 464 bulbs and fixtures. The lights and fixtures covered the outer arch, inner arch, edge, bottom, road and pedestrian pathways of the bridge. The  special lighting arrangement was inaugurated by the then Deputy Chief Minister of Tamil Nadu, M. K. Stalin, on 27 July 2010.

The lighting designers for the bridge's new look was awarded to LDP Lighting of Sydney, Australia, who have also designed the lighting for the Erasmus Bridge Rotterdam, Sydney Harbour Bridge, and the Sydney Opera House.

In 2022, the bridge was painted as a chessboard ahead of the 44th Chess Olympiad held in Chennai, India. While some commentators liked the artwork, others raised concerns that the pattern was disorienting, especially for people with anxiety disorder. The chessboard pattern also led to traffic congestion as people thronged to the bridge to take selfies and record Instagram Reels.

See also

 Architecture of Chennai
 Heritage structures in Chennai

References

Bridges completed in 1869
Bridges and flyovers in Chennai
Road bridges in India
1869 establishments in India